Bowls England governs the game of flat green outdoor bowls for men and women in England. It was formed on 1 January 2008 following a merger of the English Bowling Association and the English Women's Bowling Association.

The English Bowling Association had previously been founded in 1903 by legendary cricketer W.G. Grace who was elected its first president.

The headquarters of Bowls England are at Riverside House, Milverton Hill, Leamington Spa, having moved from Worthing in 2013. The move was partly due to the fact that both the men's and women's national championships are held at Victoria Park, just five minutes walk away.

There are thirty-five affiliated county bowling associations, to which a total of 2,700 clubs are in membership nationwide. Approximately 100,000 players come under the jurisdiction of this association.

Its chief executive is Jon Cockcroft.

See also
List of Bowls England champions

References

Bibliography

External links
 Official website

Bowls in England
Organisations based in Warwickshire
Leamington Spa
Sports governing bodies in England
Sport in Warwickshire
2008 establishments in England
Sports organizations established in 2008
Bowling organizations